Elphinstone is a rural locality in the Isaac Region, Queensland, Australia. In the  Elphinstone had a population of 6 people.

Geography 
The Suttor Developmental Road passes east to west through the locality. Isaac River and its tributary Anna Creek rise in the locality flowing towards the south-west. Lake Elphinstone is a natural lake fed by Anna Creek and was the water supply for the now abandoned town of Elphinstone.

History 
The locality was named after explorer George Elphinstone Dalrymple, the leader of the 1859 and 1860 overland settlement expeditions to Port Denison from Rockhampton.

Elphinstone Pocket State School opened circa 1936 and closed circa 1945.

In the  Elphinstone had a population of 6 people.

References 

Isaac Region
Localities in Queensland